Underground education, or clandestine education, refers to various practices of teaching carried out at times and places where such educational activities were deemed illegal.

Examples of places where widespread clandestine education practices took place included education of Blacks during the slave period in the USA and the Secret Teaching Organization in Poland under the Nazis.

There is a Greek - mostly oral - tradition claiming that secret schools (Krifo scholio) operated during the Ottoman period. There is scant written evidence for this and many historians view it as a national myth. Others believe that the Greek secret school is a legend with a core of truth. According to certain sources, secret schools for Albanians operated in late 19th century by Albanian-speaking communities and Bektashi priests or nationalists under Ottoman rule.

In Ireland during the 18th and 19th century, "Hedge schools" were illegal schools operated by Catholics and Presbyterians; at the time, only Church of Ireland education was permitted.

Secret schooling was organized in Jewish Ghettos during the Nazi regime and the German occupation in Europe. During the Taliban rule in various parts of Afghanistan (late 20th, early 21st c.), secret schools operated, mostly for women and girls. In the 1930s and 1940s, the authoritarian nationalistic regime of Brazil took anti-immigrant measures, especially against the Japanese. Japanese and other foreign schools, languages and printed material were restricted, and a compulsory assimilation program was instituted. Japanese schools became illegal in 1938. During that period, Japanese immigrants established secret schools and a newspaper in Japanese was printed.

See also 
 Jan Hus Educational Foundation
 Secret Teaching Organization
 Jędrusie
 Puńsk
 Education in Poland during World War II
 Krifo scholio
Hedge school

References

Education activism
Underground education